YGA can refer to:
 YGA (magazine), an LGBT periodical
 Young Guru Academy, a Turkish non-profit
 Yuegang'ao Greater Bay Area, a region in southern China
 Lac Gagnon Water Aerodrome, a defunct Canadian airfield (IATA code: YGA)